NIF or Nif may refer to:

Localities
 Nif, former name of the town of Kemalpaşa in western Turkey
 Mount Nif, near Kemalpaşa, Turkey
 Nifty Airport, IATA airport code "NIF"

Organizations and other abbreviations
 National Ignition Facility, a US experimental fusion facility at Lawrence Livermore National Laboratory
 National Immigration Forum, a pro-immigrant advocacy non-profit organization based in Washington, DC
 National Islamic Front, a political party of Sudan
 Nationalist and Integrationist Front of Ituri, Democratic Republic of the Congo
 Neuroscience Information Framework, a repository of global neuroscience web resources
 New Israel Fund, a U.S.-based organization that funds social justice initiatives in Israel
 National Issues Forums, a US network of organizations and individuals who sponsor public forums
 Número de Identificación Fiscal, Spain's value added tax identification number
 3D scene format of the Gamebryo/NetImmerse game engine
 NÍF Nólsoy, a former Faroese football team now known as FF Giza

 National Innovation Foundation - India, an autonomous body under the Department of Science and Technology, Government of India
 Norwegian Olympic and Paralympic Committee and Confederation of Sports, the highest governing body for sports in Norway

Biology
 Nif gene
 Nif regulon
 Neuroscience Information Framework, an inventory of web-based neurosciences data, resources, and tools
 Negative inspiratory force

Computer sciences 
 Natural Language Programming Interchange Format

Rail transportation 

 New Intercity Fleet, otherwise known as D sets, an intercity train fleet in New South Wales, Australia